Sitawaka fort, was built by the Sitawaka kingdom in Avissawella, Sri Lanka. It was adjoined with the palace of king Rajasinha I. The fort had been mounted with cannon on the river bank.

Sitawaka fort is destroyed along with palace of king and only the ruins can be seen today by the side of the Avissawella – Panawala road.

References 

Buildings and structures in Colombo District
Forts in Western Province, Sri Lanka
Kingdom of Sitawaka
Archaeological protected monuments in Kegalle District